Phyllonorycter kuhlweiniella is a moth of the family Gracillariidae. It is found from Germany to the Iberian Peninsula, Italy and Albania and from Great Britain to central and southern Russia.

There are two generations per year with adults on wing in May and again from late July to August.

The larvae feed on Quercus petraea, Quercus pubescens and Quercus robur. They mine the leaves of their host plant. They create a small lower-surface tentiform mine. Most mines are located close to the leaf margin or in a leaf lobe. The mine is almost entirely covered by the leaf margin that is folded over the mine. The lower epidermis has many, very fine folds. Pupation takes place within the mine in a large cocoon in a corner of the mine. The cocoon is attached only to the roof of the mine. Most of the frass is deposited in the opposite corner.

References

Moths described in 1839
kuhlweiniella
Moths of Europe